Kenzaburo Hara (Japanese: 原 健三郎, Hara Kenzaburō, February 6, 1907 – November 7, 2004) was a Speaker of the House of Representatives of Japan.  He served as a legislator for 54 years until he retired in 2000, and died of heart failure in Tokyo at the age of 97.

Biography
Hara was born in Hokudan, on an island in the Awaji island group, in Hyogo Prefecture in 1907. After graduating from the political and economic department of Waseda University and the graduate course of the University of Oregon, he joined Kodansha Ltd., a major publishing house. He served as managing editor of the "Gendai" magazine before becoming a legislator. He is also known as either the original author or scenario writer of five of the nine movies in the popular "Wataridori" ("Migratory Bird") series produced by Nikkatsu Corp.

Hara was first elected to the Diet in Japan's first post-war Lower House election held in 1946 with the backing of the now defunct Japan Progressive Party. He later joined the ruling Liberal Democratic Party (LDP). He had served 20 terms, totaling 54 years, as a Lower House member until he retired from politics at the age of 93 in June 2000 shortly before a general election. Hara was the second longest serving legislator in the post-war period next only to former prime minister Yasuhiro Nakasone.

After serving as labor minister and director general of the National Land Agency and the Hokkaido Development Agency, he served as Lower House speaker from July 1986 to June 1989.

Known to his constituents by the nickname "Haraken", Hara was one of the most influential politicians in Japan during the 20th century.  He served as a legislator for over half the century and became the Speaker of the Lower House. He was first elected in 1946 as General Douglas MacArthur arrived to oversee the occupation and reconstruction of Japan, following its surrender at the end of World War II. As one of the few legislators to speak proficient English, Hara was invited into the deliberations of MacArthur's inner circle.  Hara made controversial statements as measured by western standards. He was criticized for saying, "Those who'll go to nursing care homes for the aged [after they grow old] are the worst," in a speech he delivered in a Coming-of-the-Age Day ceremony in Sumoto, Awaji Island, in January 1972. He had publicly pledged to voters in his home constituency that the Akashi Strait Bridge between Kobe and Awaji Island would be built. As a sign of the influence he wielded, the bridge was opened to traffic in April 1998.

Members of the House of Representatives (Japan)
Government ministers of Japan
Speakers of the House of Representatives (Japan)
Waseda University alumni
University of Oregon alumni
1907 births
2004 deaths
Members of the House of Representatives (Empire of Japan)
Liberal Democratic Party (Japan) politicians
Recipients of the Order of the Rising Sun with Paulownia Flowers